The third season of the American psychological thriller television series You was ordered by Netflix on January 14, 2020. It features the continuation of Joe Goldberg's fraught relationship with Love, who is pregnant with his child in a new suburban home. You series creators Greg Berlanti and Sera Gamble return as co-executive producers, and Gamble returns as showrunner. Penn Badgley, Victoria Pedretti, and Saffron Burrows, who was upgraded to a series regular, reprise their roles. New cast members include Shalita Grant, Travis Van Winkle, Dylan Arnold, and Tati Gabrielle. Michaela McManus portrays Joe's new neighbor, shown at end of the second season. In December 2020, the production of the third season was suspended for two months due to the COVID-19 pandemic and resumed in February 2021. The ten-episode season premiered on October 15, 2021.

Synopsis 
In the third season, Joe and Love are married and raising their newborn son, Henry, in the fictitious Californian suburb of Madre Linda. As their relationship dynamic takes a new turn, Joe continues to repeat the cycle of obsession with a burgeoning interest in Natalie Engler, the next door neighbor. This time, Love flips the script to ensure that her dream of having the perfect family will not be torn away so easily by Joe's compulsive actions. However, after Love kills Natalie, Joe turns his obsession to Marienne, a librarian who shares a troubled childhood in the foster system. Further complicating Love and Joe's relationship, Natalie's stepson Theo falls head over heels for Love.

Cast

Main 
 Penn Badgley as Joe Goldberg, a serial killer who moves into a relatively quaint suburb with his wife, Love
 Victoria Pedretti as Love Quinn, a serial killer and Joe's wife, the only remaining heir of the Quinn family
 Saffron Burrows as Dottie Quinn, Love's mother
 Tati Gabrielle as Marienne Bellamy, a no-nonsense librarian who struggles with personal problems while trying to create a better future for herself and her young child, Juliette
 Shalita Grant as Sherry Conrad, a locally famous "momfluencer", admired by her social media followers for her well crafted persona
 Travis Van Winkle as Cary Conrad, a wealthy, charismatic, and self-proclaimed founder who runs his own supplement company
 Dylan Arnold as Theo Engler, a college student with a strained relationship with his stepfather, Matthew Engler, and who suffers from addiction issues

Recurring 
 Scott Speedman as Matthew Engler, Joe's next-door neighbor, an affluent CEO, husband and withdrawn stepfather who is reserved and at times mysterious
 Shannon Chan-Kent as Kiki, a loyal member of Sherry Conrad's clique and a prominent life coach
 Christopher Sean as Brandon, Kiki's husband who formerly worked as a tech investor and is now a stay-at-home father for their kids
 Ben Mehl as Dante Ferguson, a blind former war veteran now working as a librarian who tries to dedicate his time to his partner and two stepchildren
 Christopher O'Shea as Andrew Tucker, a fit stay-at-home dad and a close friend within Sherry Conrad's inner circle
 Bryan Safi as Jackson Newhall, Andrew Tucker's sardonic husband, a renowned tech attorney
 Mackenzie Astin as Gil Brigham, a friendly and vaccine-skeptical geology professor
Terryn Westbrook as Margaret Brigham, Gil's wife
 Ayelet Zurer as Dr. Chandra, an extremely curt but experienced couple's therapist who takes on Joe and Love as clients
 Jack Fisher as young Joe
 Marcia Cross as Jean, Matthew Engler's corporate lawyer
 Mauricio Lara as Paulie, a close friend of Joe in his formative years
 Kim Shaw as Nurse Fiona, a school nurse who helped protect a young Joe at his group home, but was living with an abusive boyfriend
 Scott Michael Foster as Ryan Goodwin, a local television reporter and well-respected single father who overcame addiction but conceals his own dark secrets from others
 Romy Rosemont as Ruthie Falco, a detective

Guest 
 Michaela McManus as Natalie Engler, Matthew Engler's second wife who harbors a secret life and who becomes Joe's new subject of obsession
 James Scully as Forty Quinn, Love's deceased twin brother
 Magda Apanowicz as Sandy Goldberg, Joe's mother

Episodes

Production

Development 
Netflix confirmed that You was renewed for a 10-episode third season on January 14, 2020, approximately three weeks after the second season was released. Prior to the official announcement, lead actor Penn Badgley accidentally let slip that there would be a third season during an Entertainment Tonight interview. Production on the third season began in February 2020 but was later suspended due to the COVID-19 pandemic. Production resumed in November 2020. Sera Gamble returned as showrunner and served as co-executive producer with series co-creator Greg Berlanti.

The first two seasons were loosely based on the books You and Hidden Bodies by Caroline Kepnes. A third book written by Kepnes was published on April 6, 2021, but it is unclear the extent to which that novel's plot will inform You's third season. When asked a question about the season following the plot of the third book in an interview with FilmInk, Gamble answered that "You'll be able to see the parallels when you read the book. But over the course of season two, Joe and Love went in a few directions different than Caroline's books. The longer a TV show exists alongside a book or a book series, the more it sort of diverges."

Filming 
For the third season, the series was awarded $7.2million in tax credits by the state of California. Filming for the third season began on November 2, 2020, and was originally scheduled to conclude in April 2021. On December 31, 2020, production for the third season was suspended for two weeks due to a surge in the COVID-19 pandemic. Filming resumed in February 2021 and ended in April 2021.

Casting 
Penn Badgley, Victoria Pedretti and Saffron Burrows reprise their roles as Joe Goldberg, Love Quinn, and Dottie Quinn respectively, with Burrows being upgraded to series regular after appearing in a recurring role in the second season. In October 2020, Travis Van Winkle and Shalita Grant were cast as series regulars and Scott Speedman was cast in a recurring role. On November 18, 2020, Dylan Arnold and Tati Gabrielle were announced as new series regular cast members, as well as recurring guests Michaela McManus, Shannon Chan-Kent, Ben Mehl, Christopher O'Shea, Christopher Sean, Bryan Safi, Mackenzie Astin, Ayelet Zurer, Jack Fisher, and Mauricio Lara – with McManus playing Joe's neighbor, shown briefly at the end of the second season. On January 25, 2021, Scott Michael Foster joined the cast in a recurring role for the third season. On April 15, 2021, it was confirmed that John Stamos would not be returning in the third season as Dr. Nicky.

Release 
As part of a video and letter to its shareholders in April 2021, Netflix's co-chief executive officer and chief content officer, Ted Sarandos confirmed that the third season of You would premiere sometime in the fourth quarter of 2021. On August 30, 2021, Netflix announced that the third season would premiere on October 15, 2021. A teaser trailer was released that day that revealed the name of Love and Joe's baby, Henry. On September 17, 2021, the official trailer for the third season was released.

Reception 
The third season received critical acclaim, with some reviewers naming it the series' best to date. On the review aggregator website Rotten Tomatoes, the season holds a 96% approval rating with an average rating of 8.00/10 based on 53 reviews. The website's critics consensus reads, "You takes its thrilling saga to the suburbs with superb results, made all the more delicious by Penn Badgley and Victoria Pedretti's committed performances." On Metacritic, the third season has a weighted average score of 77 out of 100, based on 13 critics, indicating "generally favorable reviews".

In a positive review of the third season, Clémence Michallon from The Independent wrote that, "With such an established fanbase, You could be resting on its laurels by now, endlessly recycling its initial premise without recreating the excitement of the beginning. Kudos, then, to the writers who have succeeded, exquisitely so, in taking it to new heights." Cass Clarke from Comic Book Resources recommended the third season in her review by highlighting that, "Season 3 does a fine job at showcasing the vapidness of a Silicon Valley-like suburb, where neighbors are mostly concerned with intermittent fasting, drugs and updating their Instagram stories on the hour every hour", further praising the narrative, by adding that "Yous writing is at its best when Love is given a chance to outsmart Joe, as opposed to being just more fodder for him to play with and destroy. Without spoiling the bloody mayhem to come, the You Season 3 finale showcases Pedretti's most captivating performance to date."

Brian Lowry from CNN praised the third season, stating that it is "continues the greatness of the first season and delivers a satisfying, bloody good time". Kayla Cobb of Decider gave the third season a very positive review, writing: "You season 3 is a marital therapy session wrapped in murder, lies, and even more glass cages. Stick with it, and you will be rewarded beyond your wildest, blood-soaked dreams." She said further that, "The acting is stronger than ever, now that Badgley's Joe has a worthy opponent, and you won't be able to see the season's big twists coming. No matter why you initially enjoyed You, you're going to fall in love with this new season, and Love Quinn."

References

External links 
 
 

2021 American television seasons
Television productions suspended due to the COVID-19 pandemic
Season 3